Jan Čaloun (born December 20, 1972) is a Czech former professional hockey player.  He is 180 cm (5'11") tall, 80 kg (176 lb) in weight. He shoots right and plays right wing. He was drafted by the San Jose Sharks in the fourth round, 75th overall in the 1992 NHL Entry Draft. Čaloun experienced success at the minor pro level, playing for the Kansas City Blades and Kentucky Thoroughblades, but was unable to make the big jump to the NHL. However, he did manage to score goals on his first four shots while playing for the Sharks. In 1998 he was a member of the Czech Olympic Team, which won the gold medal in Nagano.

Career statistics

Regular season and playoffs

International

External links

1972 births
Columbus Blue Jackets players
Czech ice hockey right wingers
Espoo Blues players
Czech expatriate ice hockey players in Russia
Severstal Cherepovets players
HC Litvínov players
HC Dynamo Pardubice players
HC Sibir Novosibirsk players
HC Slovan Ústečtí Lvi players
HIFK (ice hockey) players
Ice hockey players at the 1998 Winter Olympics
Kansas City Blades players
Kentucky Thoroughblades players
Living people
Olympic gold medalists for the Czech Republic
Olympic ice hockey players of the Czech Republic
Sportspeople from Ústí nad Labem
San Jose Sharks draft picks
San Jose Sharks players
Olympic medalists in ice hockey
Medalists at the 1998 Winter Olympics
Czechoslovak ice hockey right wingers
Czech expatriate ice hockey players in the United States
Czech expatriate ice hockey players in Finland